Houck Mountain is a mountain located in the Catskill Mountains of New York south of Walton, New York. Rock Rift Mountain is located southwest and Fork Mountain is located east of Houck Mountain.

References

Mountains of Delaware County, New York
Mountains of New York (state)